The minteki (kanji: 明笛; also called shinteki (kanji: 清笛)) is a Japanese transverse bamboo flute, a fue. It was first introduced to Japan from China in 1629. It is found in minshingaku (明清楽) ensembles.

See also
Ryuteki
Bamboo musical instruments

References 

Side-blown flutes
Japanese musical instruments
Bamboo flutes